Persikov may refer to:
Profesor Vladimir Persikov, the protagonist from the novel The Fatal Eggs by Mikhail Bulgakov
"Professor Persikov", a composition from the Avanti! album by Biel Ballester Trio 
, a village in Czech Republic